Zonsé is a department or commune of Boulgou Province in eastern Burkina Faso. Its capital lies at the town of Zonsé. According to the 1996 census the department has a total population of 19,916.

Towns and villages
 Zonsé (1 521 inhabitants) (capital)
 Boutaya (740 inhabitants) 
 Diarra-Betongo (870 inhabitants) 
 Diella (476 inhabitants) 
 Dimvousse (1 238 inhabitants) 
 Gnekouneta (175 inhabitants) 
 Guiemssim (1 638 inhabitants) 
 Kareta (841 inhabitants) 
 Korgoreya (424 inhabitants) 
 Koungou (821 inhabitants) 
 Kourga (2 267 inhabitants) 
 Landre (209 inhabitants) 
 Litaya (1 099 inhabitants) 
 Mangare (441 inhabitants) 
 Ponga (3 743 inhabitants) 
 Possodo (836 inhabitants) 
 Samprabissa (104 inhabitants) 
 Sangou-Nazela (71 inhabitants) 
 Saoupo (650 inhabitants) 
 Soboya (360 inhabitants) 
 Soper (727 inhabitants) 
 Yerba-Peulh (165 inhabitants) 
 Yergoya (500 inhabitants)

References

Departments of Burkina Faso
Boulgou Province